Hexamethylcyclotrisiloxane, also known as D3 and D3, is the organosilicon compound with the formula . It is a colorless or white volatile solid. It finds limited use in organic chemistry. The larger tetrameric and pentameric siloxanes, respectively octamethylcyclotetrasiloxane and decamethylcyclopentasiloxane, are of significant industrial interest, whereas 1,000–10,000 tonnes per year of the trimer is manufactured and/or imported in the European Economic Area.

Structure and reactions
Hexamethylcyclotrisiloxane adopts a planar structure and is considered strained. It reacts with organolithium reagents to give, after hydrolysis, dimethylsilanols:

Safety and environmental considerations 
The LD50 for the related pentamer (D5) is >50 g/kg in rats.

See also
 Octamethylcyclotetrasiloxane (D4)
 Decamethylcyclopentasiloxane (D5)

References

Siloxanes